Lt. Col. (R) Sardar Muhammad Ayub Khan Gadhi is a Pakistani politician and a retired military officer who had been a member of the Provincial Assembly of the Punjab from August 2018 till January 2023. Previously, he was a Member of the Provincial Assembly of the Punjab from 2008 to May 2018. He has also remained Minister for Counter Terrorism Punjab.

Early life and education 
He was born on 14 March 1961 in Toba Tek Singh.

He has a degree of Bachelor of Arts from Government College University, Lahore and has a degree of Bachelor of Laws where he received in 2005 from Punjab Law College.

He joined Pakistan Army and graduated from Pakistan Military Academy in 1980. In 2002, he retired from the Pakistan Army as Lieutenant Colonel.

Political career

He was elected to the Provincial Assembly of the Punjab as a candidate of Pakistan Muslim League (N) (PML-N) from Constituency PP-87 (Toba Tek Singh-IV) in 2008 Pakistani general election. He received 46,889 votes and defeated Javed Akram, a candidate of Pakistan Muslim League (Q) (PML-Q).

He was re-elected to the Provincial Assembly of the Punjab as a candidate of PML-N from Constituency PP-87 (Toba Tek Singh-IV) in 2013 Pakistani general election.  He received 53,582 votes and defeated Sardar Khawar Ahmed Khan Gadhi, a candidate of Pakistan Tehreek-e-Insaf (PTI). In January 2017, he was inducted into the Punjab provincial cabinet of Chief Minister Shehbaz Sharif as Provincial Minister of Punjab for counter terrorism.

He was re-elected to Provincial Assembly of the Punjab as a candidate of PML-N from Constituency PP-120 (Toba Tek Singh-III) in 2018 Pakistani general election.

References

Living people
1961 births
Pakistan Muslim League (N) MPAs (Punjab)
Punjab MPAs 2008–2013
Punjab MPAs 2013–2018
Punjab MPAs 2018–2023